West LaSalle Avenue Historic District is a national historic district located at South Bend, St. Joseph County, Indiana.  It encompasses 33 contributing buildings and 2 contributing structures in a predominantly residential section of South Bend. It developed between about 1870 and 1930, and includes notable examples of Italianate, Queen Anne, Late Gothic Revival, and Beaux-Arts style architecture and works by architects Austin & Shambleau. Notable buildings include the St. Peter's Church (1927), Frank Eby House (1904), Lydia Klinger House (1900), Woodworth House (c. 1890), Woolman House (1880), Goetz House (1892), Studebaker House (c. 1880), Kuppler House (1885), and the Gunderman House (c. 1900).

It was listed on the National Register of Historic Places in 2013.

References

Historic districts on the National Register of Historic Places in Indiana
Italianate architecture in Indiana
Queen Anne architecture in Indiana
Gothic Revival architecture in Indiana
Beaux-Arts architecture in Indiana
Historic districts in South Bend, Indiana
National Register of Historic Places in St. Joseph County, Indiana